Arcangeliella crassa is a North American secotioid fungus species in the family Russulaceae. Like other members of its genus, it should probably be transferred to the genus Lactarius. It was described from a collection made in Stanislaus National Forest, Northern California.

References

External links

 (with detailed description from original publication)\

Fungi described in 1960
Fungi of North America
Russulales
Secotioid fungi